Edward Lacey may refer to:

Edward A. Lacey (1938–1995), Canadian poet
Edward S. Lacey (1835–1916), American politician

See also
Eddie Lacy (born 1990), American football running back